Travis Smith (born 11 February 1980) is a Canadian male  track cyclist. He competed in at the 2007, 2010 and 2012 UCI Track Cycling World Championships.

References

External links
 
 
 
 
 Travis Smith at the Melbourne 2006 Commonwealth Games
 Images of Travis Smith at Getty Images

1980 births
Living people
Canadian track cyclists
Canadian male cyclists
Place of birth missing (living people)
Cyclists at the 2006 Commonwealth Games
Cyclists at the 2010 Commonwealth Games
Commonwealth Games medallists in cycling
Commonwealth Games silver medallists for Canada
Commonwealth Games bronze medallists for Canada
Medallists at the 2006 Commonwealth Games